Asi bin Shuraim Al Shammari (1854–1937) was an Arab leader of the powerful Shammar tribe and the grandfather of King Abdullah of Saudi Arabia. He was a member of the Abde section of the Shammar tribe. He was a former tribal chief and the sheikh of the southern part of the tribe.

Asi's daughter Fahda married the tenth Al Rashid emir, Saud bin Abdulaziz Al Rashid. After Emir Saud was assassinated, she remarried to Abdulaziz, later king of Saudi Arabia. She was the eighth spouse of Abdulaziz. She was one of the two Al Rashid women married to him. She was the mother of Abdulaziz and Mishaal by her first marriage as well as King Abdullah, Princess Nouf and Princess Seeta by her second marriage.

Asi became one of the most prominent supporters of King Abdulaziz. He joined his forces in several battles during the formation of Saudi Arabia, including the Battle of Sabilla in 1929. He died in 1937.

References

1854 births
1937 deaths
House of Rashid
House of Saud